Kandiah Kanagaratnam (28 July 1892 – 3 October 1962) was a Ceylon Tamil civil servant, politician, Member of Parliament and Parliamentary Secretary.

Early life
Kanagaratnam was born on 28 July 1892. He was the son of Kandiah from Vaddukoddai in northern Ceylon.

Career
Kanagaratnam joined the Government Clerical Service in 1911. He became Chief Audit Examiner in 1925. He was later Deputy Auditor General and Acting Auditor General.

Kanagaratnam contested the 1947 parliamentary election as the All Ceylon Tamil Congress' (ACTC) candidate in Vaddukoddai. He won the election and entered Parliament. The ACTC joined the United National Party led government on 3 September 1948 and Kanagaratnam was appointed Parliamentary Secretary to the Minister of Education.

Kanagaratnam stood for re-election at the 1952 parliamentary election but was defeated by independent candidate V. Veerasingam.

References

1892 births
1962 deaths
All Ceylon Tamil Congress politicians
Members of the 1st Parliament of Ceylon
Parliamentary secretaries of Ceylon
People from Northern Province, Sri Lanka
People from British Ceylon
Sri Lankan Tamil civil servants
Sri Lankan Tamil politicians